New France
Psychological warfare